Tony Cristiani is a former American football defensive lineman who played college football for the University of Miami.  He was a two-time All-American and a consensus All-American in 1973.  Cristiani was also a member of the Chicago Fire, Detroit Wheels and Hamilton Tiger-Cats.

Early years
Cristiani comes from a family of circus performers and walked the tightrope at an early age.  He attended Brandon High School in Brandon, Florida, and played high school football for the Brandon Eagles, earning all-state honors.

College years
Cristiani received an athletic scholarship to attend the University of Miami, where he played for the Miami Hurricanes football team.  He was a consensus first-team All-American in 1973. He had 102 tackles as a senior. Cristiani had 84 tackles and 15 quarterback sacks in 1972. He had 279 total tackles in his career at the University of Miami.  Cristiani was inducted into the University of Miami Sports Hall of Fame in 1991.

Professional career

Chicago Fire
Crisitani spent time with the Chicago Fire and but was released after three days in camp in 1974.

Detroit Wheels
Cristiani was a member of the Detroit Wheels of the World Football League in 1974

Hamilton Tiger-Cats
Cristiani was signed by the Hamilton Tiger-Cats of the Canadian Football League in May 1975.

References

Living people
Year of birth missing (living people)
Players of American football from Florida
American football defensive ends
Miami Hurricanes football players
All-American college football players
People from Brandon, Florida
Sportspeople from Hillsborough County, Florida
Detroit Wheels players
Hamilton Tiger-Cats players
Chicago Fire (WFL) players